Tariq Mahmood is a British Pakistani man who was captured in Islamabad by Pakistani security forces in October 2003.
His family reports that Tariq was tortured, while in Pakistani custody, with the knowledge or cooperation of UK and American security officials.

Background
Tariq Mahmood is a married father of two from Sparkhill, Birmingham. The former taxi driver flew to Pakistan in 2001 to settle a land dispute over a family home there.

Arrest
In October 2003, Mahmood was held on suspicion of being associated with a "banned organization" under the Security of Pakistan Act, Section 10, and was not given immediate access to courts despite his British citizenship.

Mahmood was initially assigned a 10 November 2003 court date in Islamabad, and made court appearances over the following four weeks. However, despite the ongoing legal process, his whereabouts became unclear by early 2004. Pakistani security reportedly turned him over to American forces, prompting fears he would be sent to Guantanamo Bay Naval Base. In February 2004, Pakistani intelligence sources indicated Tariq Mahmood had been transported to Bagram Airfield, Afghanistan, a "stepping stone" to Guantanamo Bay.

Human Rights Watch listed him as one of 39 ghost detainees in 2005, who are not given any legal rights or access to counsel, and who are likely not reported to or seen by the International Committee of the Red Cross.

On February 19, 2004, The Guardian listed the nine UK citizens then known to have been held in Guantanamo.
They listed him as a possible 10th UK citizen held in Guantanamo. His presence in Guantanamo has never been confirmed.

According to articles from The Guardian quoted in a report by a committee of the UK Parliament, Tariq is believed to have made his home in Dubai following his release in 2004.

See also
List of people who disappeared

References

2000s missing person cases
English people of Pakistani descent
Living people
Missing people
Missing person cases in Pakistan
Pakistani extrajudicial prisoners of the United States
Year of birth missing (living people)